Wellington's Victory: Battle of Waterloo – 18 June 1815 is a board wargame simulation of the Battle of Waterloo, originally published by Simulations Publications, Inc. (SPI) in 1976.

Description
This is two-person or three-person tabletop game — either one person can take on the French while the other takes both the Anglo-Allied forces and the Prussians, or the Anglo-Allied and Prussian forces can be divided between two players. Characterized as a "monster game" because of its large number of counters, this  is a battalion-level simulation of the Battle of Waterloo, with a 68" x 44" map of the seven-mile battle front (100 yards per hex), and 2000 counters. Rules are included to allow for battle formation tactics, skirmishers, and artillerists.

Components
The components in the original SPI and TSR boxed sets are:
rulebook, which includes a pullout sheet with deployment charts
5 sheets of counters totalling 2000 die-cut counters representing French, Anglo-Allied and Prussian units
2 Combat Strength Marker Sheets
a 68" x 44" paper hex map in four sections
1 plastic six-sided die
2 plastic trays for holding counters

In Decision Games' redesigned 2014 edition, the box holds:
32-page rulebook
16-page Color Battle Analysis
counter Sheets holding 1,960 die-cut counters
4 34" x 22" soft maps
2 Player Aid Sheets
1 Time Display Sheet
3 Army Display Sheets
1 Prussian Off-Board Approach Sheet
6 six-sided Dice
Counter storage bags

Publication history
Wellington's Victory was originally designed by Frank Davis and published by SPI in 1976 in a flat box. After TSR took over SPI in 1982, Wellington's Victory was re-issued under the TSR trademark in a standard-sized "bookcase" box. In 2015, Decision Games acquired the rights to Wellington's Victory, and published a streamlined game redesigned by Chris Perello.

Reception
In his 1977 book The Comprehensive Guide to Board Wargaming, Nicholas Palmer noted the extremely detailed map, pointing out the game had "1600 counters, and a mere hundred yards per hex." Palmer concluded "Movement [is] mostly in brigade-sized columns, fortunately for playability, but it's still an imposing game." 

In Issue 14 of Imagine, Peter O'Toole reviewed the TSR edition, and liked the rules on firing factors, formations, unit effectiveness and cavalry charges. But he was dubious about skirmishers, and thought TSR's change of artwork on the cover was "terrible". Despite these quibbles, O'Toole concluded with a strong recommendation, saying, "Despite minor flaws the game is a classic. You feel the pressure the commanders felt. As Wellington you look on your thinning ranks and can honestly wish that God will 'Give me night or give me Blucher'."

In Issue 53 of Moves, Ian Chadwick warned that "its very size and complexity demand serious commitment and concentration of effort." He concluded, "A few words cannot begin to convey the excitement, the pleasure, nor the trials of playing this game", and gave it a "B+" for playability, an "A" for historical accuracy, and a "A" for component quality.

Paul Comben found several weaknesses in the rules concerning cavalry charges, found several historical errors in the setup, and questioned the lack of a system to simulate desertions during the battle. But overall, he felt the game provided an adequate if not a stimulating simulation, saying, "Where the SPI system shows at its strongest is, as I have said, in the function of this arm and that arm, the timing of correct deployment, and the advantages of good morale. But it remains process more than anything else."

Awards
At the 1977 Origins Awards, Wellington's Victory was a finalist in two categories for Charles S. Roberts Awards:
Best Tactical Game of 1976
Best Graphics & Physical Systems of 1976

Other reviews
Strategy & Tactics, Issue 60 (Jan/Feb 1977)
Fire & Movement, Issue 6 (March/April 1977)
Moves, Issue 34 (August/September 1977)
 Casus Belli #33 (June 1986)

References

Board games introduced in 1976
Napoleonic Wars board wargames
Simulations Publications games
Wargames introduced in 1976